The 1993 National Camogie League is a competition in the women's team field sport of camogie was won by Kilkenny, who defeated Cork in the final, played at Ballyragget.

Arrangements
The tournament was played with 15-a-side on an experimental basis, three years before the rules of camogie were changed to facilitate 15-a-side teams.

The Final
Kilkenny’s victory over three-in-a-row seeking Cork was regarded as a surprise. Angela Downey scored three of their goals and her twin sister Ann the fourth. Kilkenny dominated in most parts of the field. Cork were first to score with a goal after three minutes from Stephanie Dunlea. Points by Angela Downey and Breda Holmes put Kilkenny ahead after 15 minutes. Three well taken points by Colette O'Mahoney put Cork back in front. Ann and Angela Downey scored goals to give Kilkenny a three-point 2-5 to 1-5 lead at half time. Angela Downey’s second goal came 12 minutes into the second half, giving Kilkenny the advantage and after Cork fought back with points from Colette O'Mahoney and Fiona O'Driscoll, Angela Downey put the icing on the cake for Kilkenny with her third goal in the 16th minute to give Kilkenny a 4-7 to 1-9 lead. Cork pulled the lead back to three points before the final whistle.

Division 2
The Junior National League, known since 2006 as Division Two, was won by Armagh who defeated Dublin in the final. Armagh defeated Tipperary and Dublin defeated Galway in the semi-finals.

Final stages

References

External links
 Camogie Association

National Camogie League
1993